Your Computer was a British computer magazine published monthly from 1981 to 1988, and aimed at the burgeoning home computer market. At one stage it was, in its own words, "Britain's biggest selling home computer magazine". It offered support across a wide range of computer formats, and included news, type-in programs, and reviews of both software and hardware. Hardware reviews were notable for including coverage of the large number of home microcomputers released during the early 1980s.

References

External links
 Your Computer at the Internet Archive
 Archive of BBC & Electron games published in Your Computer at Acorn Electron World

1981 establishments in the United Kingdom
1988 disestablishments in the United Kingdom
Monthly magazines published in the United Kingdom
Video game magazines published in the United Kingdom
Defunct computer magazines published in the United Kingdom
Home computer magazines
Magazines established in 1981
Magazines disestablished in 1988
Mass media in Surrey